National University of Ukraine on Physical Education and Sport is a Ukrainian university in Kyiv.

History
The university opened in 1930 as the National Institute of Physical Education of Ukraine in Kharkiv. In 1944 the institute was transferred to Kyiv and changed its name to Kyiv State Institute of Physical Education.

After the independence of Ukraine, in 1995 the university was reorganized in Kyiv National University of Physical Education, which in 1998 acquired the status of national and adopted the name of the National University of Physical Education and Sport of Ukraine.

Structure
Four faculties function in the structure of the university and one branch in Ivano-Frankivsk.

Coach Faculty
Sport and Management Faculty
Health, Physical Education and Tourism Faculty
Extra-Mural Faculty (distance learning)
Ivano-Frankivsk College of Physical Education

Sports and supporting facilities
 Rowing facilities at Dnieper
 Biking and skiing facilities at the Holosiiv Park
 Sports complex "Olimp" 
 main short course pool with six lanes (25x12 m)
 two children's pools (13.6x2.8 m and 5.7x2.8 m)
 Fitness center "Olimpiysky styl" (Olympic style)
 Center of sport traumatology
 International center of Olympic research and education
 Research Institute
 Library

References
 Official site

1930 establishments in the Soviet Union
Sports universities and colleges
Universities and colleges in Kyiv
Sport in Kyiv
Educational institutions established in 1930
 
National universities in Ukraine